The CubCrafters CC11-160 Carbon Cub SS is an ASTM certified light-sport aircraft based on the Piper J-3 Cub manufactured by Cub Crafters. It is modernized, with light-weight carbon fiber components and a  engine.

In January 2016 the Carbon Cub was named AVweb's "Airplane of the Year" for 2015.

Development 
The Carbon Cub SS was originally named the "CubCrafters Super Sport Cub". In order to maintain certification under American Light Sport Aircraft limitations the maximum takeoff power is limited to five minutes.

Design 
The Carbon Cub SS uses a carbon fiber spinner and air-induction scoop. The Carbon Cub weighs  less than a Piper PA-18 Super Cub. The carbon cowling weighs . The fuselage is welded SAE 4130 chrome-molybdenum steel tubing with fabric covering. The wings are fitted with vortex generators for low-speed flight control. Some models use a partial color on silver base coat paint job that weighs  less than an all-color paint job.

The CC340 engine, based on the Lycoming O-320, is developed with Engine Components International, Inc. (ECi), using dual electronic ignition and ECi O-320 cylinders.

Variants 
CubCrafters CC11-100 Sport Cub S2
An O-200 powered LSA variant
CubCrafters Carbon Cub EX

Specifications (Carbon Cub SS)

References

External links 

2000s United States sport aircraft
Light-sport aircraft
Cub Crafters aircraft
High-wing aircraft
Single-engined tractor aircraft